Need ei vaata tagasi... (These won't look back...) is a 5-CD compilation by Estonian rock band Ruja. The purpose of this project was to release the whole of Ruja's works, although many songs are absent from the compilation.

Osa 2 (Part 2) contains the last 3 CD-s. It is preceded by "Need ei vaata tagasi... Osa 1".

Track listing

CD3: PopRUJA
 Must ronk (Black crow) (Rein Rannap/Ott Arder) – 2:50 (1981)
 Leiutaja ja laiutaja (Inventor and boaster [roughly]) (Rein Rannap/Arder) – 1:49 (1981)
 Tule metsa (Come to the woods) (Rannap/Arder) – 3:10 (1981)
 Kes kellega käib (Who dates who) (Rannap/Arder) – 2:20 (1982)
 Aafrika mehed (African men) (Rannap/Juhan Liiv) – 2:06 (1981)
 Sa oled mul teine (You're my second) (Rannap/Arder) – 3:19 (1982)
 Rahu (Peace) (Rannap/Urmas Alender) – 3:34 (1981)
 Õunalaul (Apple song) (Rannap/Arder) – 3:11 (1981)
 Tule minuga sööklasse (Come to the diner with me) (Rannap/Arder) – 2:34 (1981)
 Dr. Noormann (Rannap/Rannap) – 2:54 (1981)
 Suudlus läbi jäätunud klaasi (Kiss through a frozen glass) (Rannap/Arder) – 3:17 (1982)
 Igapäevane rock (Everyday rock) (Rannap/Arder) – 2:38 (1982)
 Inimene õpib (Human learns) (Rannap/Arder) – 3:28 (1981)
 Eile nägin ma Eestimaad (Yesterday I saw Estonia) (Rannap/Liiv, Arder) – 2:13 (1981)
 To Mr. Lennon (Alender/Alender) – 3:31 (1981)
 Praegu (Now) (Rannap/Juhan Viiding) – 2:19 (1980)
 Ars longa (Art long [in Latin, from the saying ars longa, vita brevis (art long, life short)]) (Rannap/Arder) – 3:01 (1982)
 Rumal rahutus (Foolish anxiety) (Rannap/Arder) – 2:52 (1982)
 Tango (Rannap/Arder) – 3:07 (1982)
 Noor teab mis teeb (Young knows what he's doing) (Rannap/Arder) – 3:55 (1982)
 Rävala rock (Rannap/Viiding) – 2:38 (1982)
 Rujaline roostevaba maailm (Scientific-fictional rust-free world [a word play – "ruja", the name of the band, was also a proposed neologism for "science fiction"]) (Rannap/Arder) – 3:36 (1982)
 Mida me räägime teistest (What we talk about others) (Rannap/Arder) – 3:35 (1982)
 Head ööd (Good night) (Rannap/Lydia Koidula) – 2:23 (1982)

CD4: Sildade põletajad (Bridge-burners)
 Kes meeldida tahab... (Who wants to be liked...) (Igor Garšnek/Juhan Liiv) – 2:26 (1985)
 Dokumentideta võõras linnas (In a strange town without documents) (Toomas Rull/Alender) – 3:15 (1985)
 Mida teeksid siis? (What would you do then?) (Urmas Alender, Jaanus Nõgisto, Garšnek/Alender) – 3:29 (1985)
 Vaiki kui võid (Be silent if you may) (Alender/Alender) – 3:59 (1985)
 Sõbra käsi (Friend's hand) (Alender/Alender) – 3:33 (1985)
 Sildade põletajad (Bridge-burners) (Garšnek/Alender) – 3:26 (1985)
 Teisel pool vett (On the other side of the water) (Alender/Alender) – 3:16 (1986)
 Murtud lilled (Broken flowers) (Garšnek/Hando Runnel) – 3:32 (1986)
 Veerev kivi (Rolling stone) (Nõgisto/Vladislav Koržets) – 5:48 (1986)
 Oled sa järv? (Are you a lake?) (Garšnek/Alender) – 4:27 (1986)
 Lootuselaul (Hope song) (S. P. Gulliver/Alender) – 4:30 (1986)
 Kahe näoga Janus (Two-faced Janus) (Alender, Nõgisto, Garšnek/Alender) – 3:07 (1986)
 Pime sõda (Blind war) (Garšnek/Alender) – 2:58 (1985)
 Meeste laul (Men's song) (Nõgisto/Nõgisto) – 3:37 (1986)
 Mis teha? (What to do?) (Garšnek, Nõgisto/Garšnek, Nõgisto) – 3:50 (1987)
 Isamaa pale (Face of the fatherland) (Garšnek/Runnel) – 3:11 (1986)
 Tulekell (Fire clock) (Garšnek/Alender) – 3:12 (1986)
 Eleegia (Elegy) (Alender/Alender) – 3:27 (1985)
 Aeg on nagu rong (Time is like a train) (Garšnek/Malle Värk) – 3:25 (1985)
 Ahtumine (Narrowing) (Alender, Nõgisto, Garšnek/Artur Alliksaar) – 2:56 (1985)
Note: There is also another song titled "Ahtumine", which is also on "Need ei vaata tagasi... Osa 1".

CD5: Tundmatu RUJA (Unknown RUJA)
 Avamäng karjega (Overture with a scream) (Garšnek) – 1:50 (1986)
 Ärka otsiv vaim (Wake seeking spirit) (Garšnek/Alender) – 2:45 (1985)
 Mu isamaa on minu arm (My fatherland is my love) (Rannap/Koidula) – 2:08 (1982)
 Laulu sisu (The content of the song) (Rannap/Koidula) – 4:28 (1984)
 Raske aeg (Though time) (Rannap/Viiding) – 2:52 (1980)
 Ma mustas öös näen... (In the black night I see...) (Olav Ehala/Viiding) – 2:47 (1980)
 Tööaskeldus (Work bustling) (Nõgisto/Mati Unt) – 3:03 (1979)
 Meediaaskeldus (Media bustling) (Nõgisto/Unt) – 1:48 (1979)
 Rahvalaulufraas (Folksongphrase) (Nõgisto/Viiding) – 4:56 (1979)
 Laul surnud linnust (Song of a dead bird) (Ehala/August Sang) – 4:03 (1980)
 Killud toovad õnne (Shards bring luck) (Rannap/Arder) – 4:37 (1982)
 Käsi (Hand) (Rannap/Arder) – 2:59 (1982)
 Aeg (Time) (Rannap/Runnel) – 6:43 (1983)
 Viru vanne (Viru vow) (Rannap/Runnel) – 3:18 (1983)
 Oota mind (Wait for me) (Andres Valkonen/Leelo Tungal) – 3:09 (1985)
 Ih-ih-hii ja ah-ah-haa (He-he-hee and ha-ha-ha) (Garšnek, Alender, S. P. Gulliver/Alender) – 3:48 (1988)
 Päikeselapsed (Children of the Sun) (Nõgisto/Nõgisto) – 4:01 (1987)
 Kui mõtled enda pääle (When you think about yourself) (Nõgisto/Runnel) – 3:37 (1982)
 Laul võimalusest (Song of a chance) (Ehala/Sang) – 3:52 (1980)
 Luigelaul (Swan song) (Garšnek/Alender) – 3:58 (1987)
 Nii vaikseks kõik on jäänud (1985) (It has all become so quiet) (Rannap/Ernst Enno) – 1:51 (1971/1985)

Personnel

PopRUJA
 Urmas Alender – lead vocals
 Jaanus Nõgisto – guitars; vocals on tracks 5 & 6
 Rein Rannap – keyboards; vocals on track 5
 Tiit Haagma – bass
 Jaan Karp – percussion
 Arvo Urb – percussion (1, 2)
 Mixed choir "Noorus" (17)
 Paul Mägi chamber orchestra (14, 15)
 Eesti Raadio Estraadiorkester (Estonian Radio stage orchestra) (7)

Sildade põletajad
 Urmas Alender – lead vocals
 Indrek Patte – vocals (11, 14, 15)
 Jaanus Nõgisto – guitars
 Igor Garšnek – keyboards
 Tiit Haagma – bass
 S. P. Gulliver (Vladislav Petšnikov) – bass (9–17)
 Toomas Rull – percussion
 Rein Joasoo – percussion (9–14, 21)
 Arvo Urb – percussion (15, 17)

Tundmatu RUJA
 Urmas Alender – lead vocals
 Ivo Linna – vocals (15)
 Indrek Patte – vocals (17)
 Jaanus Nõgisto – guitars
 Ain Varts – guitar (4)
 Raul Jaanson – guitar (16)
 Igor Garšnek – keyboards (1, 2, 15–17, 20)
 Rein Rannap – keyboards (3–5, 11–14, 18)
 Margus Kappel – keyboards (6–10, 15, 19)
 Olav Ehala – keyboards (6, 10, 19, 21)
 S. P. Gulliver (Vladislav Petšnikov) – bass (1, 16, 17, 20)
 Tiit Haagma – bass (2, 3, 5, 11–15, 18)
 Priit Kuulberg – bass (4, 6–10, 19)
 Rein Joasoo – percussion (1)
 Toomas Rull – percussion (2, 15, 21)
 Jaan Karp – percussion (3, 11–14, 18)
 Andrus Vaht – percussion (4, 5)
 Ivo Varts – percussion (6–10, 19)
 Arvo Urb – percussion (16, 17, 20)

Ruja albums
1999 compilation albums
Estonian-language albums